Presidente Transportes Aéreos was a Brazilian airline founded in 1996. In 2001 it ceased operations.

History 
Presidente Transportes Aéreos was founded as a general aviation company in 1987. In 1996 it was authorized to become a regional scheduled carrier, with services operated from Presidente Prudente. In 1998 the company reduced operations and in May 1999 it was grounded. In 2000 the owner of the aircraft re-possessed the aircraft for lack of payment. As a last attempt for survival its operational base was transferred to Cuiabá but in 2001 Presidente ceased operations.

Destinations 
Presidente served the following cities:
Aripuanã – Aripuanã Airport
Assis – Marcelo Pires Halzhausen Airport
Brasília – Pres. Juscelino Kubitschek International Airport
Campo Grande – Campo Grande International Airport
Cascavel – Adalberto Mendes da Silva Airport
Cuiabá – Marechal Rondon International Airport
Curitiba
Foz do Iguaçu – Cataratas International Airport
Goiânia – Santa Genoveva Airport
Ituiutaba
Juruena – Juruena Airport
Nova Andradina
Ourinhos – Jornalista Benedito Pimentel Airport
Presidente Prudente – Presidente Prudente Airport
Rondonópolis – Maestro Marinho Franco Airport
São José do Rio Preto – Prof. Eribelto Manoel Reino Airport
São Paulo – Congonhas Airport
Sinop – Sinop Airport

Fleet

See also 

List of defunct airlines of Brazil

References

External links 
Presidente Photo Archive at airliners.net

Defunct airlines of Brazil
Airlines established in 1996
Airlines disestablished in 2001